The 2013 O'Reilly Auto Parts 300 was the sixth stock car race of the 2013 NASCAR Nationwide Series and the 17th iteration of the event. The race was held on Friday, April 12, 2013, in Fort Worth, Texas at Texas Motor Speedway, a  permanent tri-oval shaped racetrack. The race took the scheduled 200 laps to complete. Kyle Busch, driving for Joe Gibbs Racing, would dominate the race to win his 55th career NASCAR Nationwide Series win, his fourth of the season, and his third consecutive win. To fill out the podium, Brad Keselowski of Penske Racing and Austin Dillon of Richard Childress Racing would finish second and third, respectively.

Background 

Texas Motor Speedway is a speedway located in the northernmost portion of the U.S. city of Fort Worth, Texas – the portion located in Denton County, Texas. The track measures 1.5 miles (2.4 km) around and is banked 24 degrees in the turns, and is of the oval design, where the front straightaway juts outward slightly. The track layout is similar to Atlanta Motor Speedway and Charlotte Motor Speedway (formerly Lowe's Motor Speedway). The track is owned by Speedway Motorsports, Inc., the same company that owns Atlanta and Charlotte Motor Speedway, as well as the short-track Bristol Motor Speedway.

Entry list

Practice

First practice 
The first practice session was held on Thursday, April 11, at 5:30 PM CST, and would last for an hour and 20 minutes.

Second and final practice 
The second and final practice session, sometimes referred to as Happy Hour, was held on Friday, April 12, at 2:00 PM CST, and would last for an hour and 20 minutes.

Qualifying 
Qualifying was held on Friday, April 12, at 4:05 PM CST. Each driver would have two laps to set a fastest time; the fastest of the two would count as their official qualifying lap.

Five drivers would fail to qualify: Scott Riggs, Joey Gase, Chase Miller, Jason White, and Michael McDowell.

Full qualifying results

Race results

References 

2013 NASCAR Nationwide Series
NASCAR races at Texas Motor Speedway
April 2013 sports events in the United States
2013 in sports in Texas